Cashibo (Caxibo, Cacibo, Cachibo, Cahivo), Cacataibo, Cashibo-Cacataibo, Managua, or Hagueti is an indigenous language of Peru in the region of the Aguaytía, San Alejandro, and Súngaro rivers. It belongs to the Panoan language family.

Dialects are Kashibo (Kaschinõ), Rubo/Isunbo, Kakataibo, and Nokamán,<ref>Biondi, Roberto Zariquiey. 2013. Tessmann's <Nokamán>: a linguistic investigation of a mysterious Panoan group. Cadernos de Etnolingüística, volume 5, número 2, dezembro/2013.</ref> which until recently had been thought to be extinct.

 Phonology 

 Consonants 

The consonant inventory includes both a bilabial approximant, realized as [β̞], and a labial-velar approximant /w/.

 Vowels 

Back vowels /o/ and /u/ are phonetically realized as less rounded; [o̜], [u̜].

Statistics
The language is official along the Aguaytía, San Alejandro, and Súngaro rivers in Perú where it is most widely spoken. It is used in schools until third grade. There are not many monolinguals, although some women over the age of fifty are.

There is five to ten percent literacy compared to fifteen to twenty-five percent literacy in Spanish as a second language. A Cashibo-Cacataibo dictionary has been compiled, and there is a body of literature, especially poetry.

References

 Campbell, Lyle. (1997). American Indian languages: The historical linguistics of Native America. New York: Oxford University Press. .
 Kaufman, Terrence. (1990). Language history in South America: What we know and how to know more. In D. L. Payne (Ed.), Amazonian linguistics: Studies in lowland South American languages'' (pp. 13–67). Austin: University of Texas Press. .

External links 
 ELAR archive of Cashibo-Cacataibo language documentation materials
Cashibo (Intercontinental Dictionary Series)

Languages of Peru
Panoan languages